Cajon Canyon, originally named El Cajon De San Gabriel De Amuscopiabit, El Cajon in Spanish meaning "the box" in English, is a long valley ending in a box canyon in the northeastern San Gabriel Mountains, within San Bernardino County, California.

Geography
The steep slopes around the edges of the box canyon section in its upper reaches, making it difficult to enter and leave it, led to its acquiring this name Cajon. 

California State Route 138 runs through the length of the valley, between Interstate 15 and Angeles Crest Highway.

See also

References

Canyons and gorges of California
San Gabriel Mountains
Valleys of San Bernardino County, California
Mormon Road